Andrei Cross (born 2 June 1984) is a Barbadian former swimmer, who specialized in the breaststroke events. Cross represented his nation Barbados at the 2008 Summer Olympics, and in two editions of the Commonwealth Games (2002 and 2006), establishing a national record of 29.24 in the 50 m breaststroke. During his swimming career, Cross was affiliated with TeamBath, the sports organization of England's University of Bath, under the tutelage of head coach Mark Skimming.

Cross competed in the men's 100 m breaststroke at the 2008 Summer Olympics in Beijing. Leading up to the Games, he cleared the FINA-B entry standard time in 1:03.64 to assure his selection to the Olympic team at the 2007 Maribor Open in Slovenia. Swimming in heat three of the evening prelims, Cross held off his fast pace over Uzbekistan's Ivan Demyanenko to save the penultimate spot from the eight-swimmer field by 0.17 seconds. Cross' time of 1:04.57 was not good enough to put him through to the semifinals, finishing only in fifty-fifth place overall.

He works as a manager facility at Barbados Amateur Swimming Association.

References

External links
NBC Olympics Profile
Profile – Team Bath

1984 births
Living people
Barbadian male swimmers
Commonwealth Games competitors for Barbados
Swimmers at the 2002 Commonwealth Games
Swimmers at the 2006 Commonwealth Games
Pan American Games competitors for Barbados
Swimmers at the 2007 Pan American Games
Olympic swimmers of Barbados
Swimmers at the 2008 Summer Olympics
Competitors at the 2006 Central American and Caribbean Games
Central American and Caribbean Games medalists in swimming
Central American and Caribbean Games bronze medalists for Barbados
Male breaststroke swimmers
Sportspeople from Bridgetown
Team Bath swimmers